Dalabon or Dangbon may refer to:
 Dalabon people, an ethnic group of Australia
 Dalabon language, an Australian language

Language and nationality disambiguation pages